Futsi Atlético Navalcarnero is a Spanish Primera División women's futsal club based in Navalcarnero.The club won the Spanish championship in season 2015–2016. In 2017 the team will participate in the European Women's Futsal Tournament together with the champions from Italy, Portugal, Russia, Ukraine and the Netherlands. Atlético Navalcarnero is the organizing club.

Club names 
 1999–2006: Futsi Atlético Féminas
 2006–2009: Encofra Navalcarnero
 2009–2015: Atlético de Madrid Navalcarnero
 2015– : Futsi Atlético Navalcarnero

Club honours

Regional competitions
Trofeo Comunidad de Madrid: 11 (1999, 2000, 2002, 2003, 2010, 2013, 2014, 2015, 2016, 2017)
 Runners-up: 3 (2001, 2004, 2009)
Copa Federación Madrileña: 1 (2012)

National competitions
Primera División 5 (2011–12, 2013–14, 2014–15, 2016–17, 2018–19)
 Copa de España: 7 (2007, 2008, 2009, 2014, 2015, 2016, 2018)
 Runners-up: (3) (2012, 2013, 2017)
 Supercopa de España: 7 (2008, 2012, 2013, 2014, 2016, 2017, 2018)
 Runners-up: (3) (2007, 2009, 2015)

European competitions
 European Women's Futsal Tournament: 2 (2017, 2018)
 Iberian Cup: 1 (2012)

Players

Current Squad 2017/18

Notable players

  Vanessa Barberá
  Raquel Souza
  Patricia Chamorro
  Isabel Izquierdo
  Silvia Fernández
  Eva Manguan
  Laura Fernández
  Sara Iturriaga
  Jennifer Pedro
  Priscila Farias
  Rosana Carballes
  Anita Luján
  Natalia Flores
  Belén de Uña
  Fabiana Ribeiro
  Juliana Delgado
  Leticia Sánchez
  Ariane Nacimento
  Amelia Romero
  Marta Pelegrín

References

Women's futsal clubs